Latauro Chávez (born 26 May 1966) is an Argentine cyclist. He competed in the men's cross-country mountain biking event at the 1996 Summer Olympics.

References

External links
 

1966 births
Living people
Argentine male cyclists
Olympic cyclists of Argentina
Cyclists at the 1996 Summer Olympics
Place of birth missing (living people)
20th-century Argentine people
21st-century Argentine people